Carlton Edward Lemke (October 11, 1920 - April 12, 2004) was an American mathematician.

Lemke received his bachelor's degree in 1949 at the University of Buffalo and his PhD (Extremal Problems in Linear Inequalities) in 1953 at Carnegie Mellon University (then Carnegie Institute of Technology). In 1952-1954 he was instructor at the Carnegie Institute of Technology and in 1954–55 at the Knolls Atomic Power Laboratory of General Electric. In 1955-56 he was an engineer at the Radio Corporation of America in New Jersey. From 1956 he was assistant professor and later professor at the Rensselaer Polytechnic Institute. Since 1967, he was there Ford Foundation Professor of Mathematics.

His research is in Algebra, Mathematical Programming, Operations Research, and Statistics. In 1954 Lemke developed the dual simplex method, independently from E. M. L. Beale.

He is also known for his contribution to game theory. In 1964 Lemke (with J. T. Howson) constructed an algorithm for finding Nash equilibria the case of finite two-person games. For this work Lemke received in 1978 the John von Neumann Theory Prize.
He was elected to the 2002 class of Fellows of the Institute for Operations Research and the Management Sciences.

Selected bibliography
 Lemke, Carlton E. The dual method of solving the linear programming problem, Naval Research Logistics Quarterly, Vol. 1, 1954, pp. 36–47
 Lemke, Carlton E. and J. T. Howson. Equilibrium points of bimatrix games, Journal of the SIAM, Volume 12, 1964, pp. 413–423

References

External links
 
 Biography of Carlton Lemke from the Institute for Operations Research and the Management Sciences

20th-century American mathematicians
1920 births
Game theorists
John von Neumann Theory Prize winners
Fellows of the Institute for Operations Research and the Management Sciences
2004 deaths
University at Buffalo alumni
Carnegie Mellon University alumni